Symplectromyces is a genus of fungi in the family Laboulbeniaceae.

References

External links
Symplectromyces at Index Fungorum

Laboulbeniomycetes